Turrettini (or Turretin) is the surname of three related Genevan theologians, a Swiss architect, and a scholar of East Asian studies:

Bénédict Turrettini (1588–1631)
François Turrettini (1623–1687)
Jean-Alphonse Turrettini (1671–1737)
Maurice Turrettini (1878–1932)
François Turrettini (Sinologist) (1845–1908)